Den nya nordiska floran ("The new Nordic flora") is a book of Swedish flora from 2003 by Bo Mossberg and Lennart Stenberg, with illustrations by Bo Mossberg. It contains descriptions, illustrations and distribution maps of all plants in Sweden, Denmark, Norway (including Svalbard), Finland, Faroe Islands and Iceland, a total of more than 3,250 species. It is a sequel to the earlier book Den nordiska floran. It has been called indispensable as a reference book, but criticized for being too heavy to be a field flora. It was translated into Danish by Jon Feilberg, titled Den Nye Nordiske Flora. The book is fact-checked by Thomas Karlsson. It was also translated into Norwegian by Steinar Moen, with fact-checking by Svein Båtvik. The title of this version is Gyldendals store nordiske flora. Revidert og utvidet utgave.

Editions

References

External links 
  Checklista över Nordens kärlväxter by Thomas Karlsson

Florae (publication)
Botany in Europe
Flora of Finland
Flora of Norway
Flora of Sweden